Central University of Tamil Nadu (CUTN) is a central university located in Thiruvarur, Tamil Nadu.

History
CUTN was established by the Government of India in 2009 under the Central Universities Act, 2009. It was inaugurated in September 2009 and B. P. Sanjay has been appointed the first vice-chancellor (VC). Aditya Prasad Dash was appointed VC in August 2015.

G. Padmanabhan replaced V. Krishnamurthy as Chancellor in July 2018. Karpaga Kumaravel replaced Aditya Prasad Dash as acting VC in August 2020. A selection panel for a new VC was set in October 2020 and a shortlist was submitted in January 2021 but , no VC was appointed. Prof. M. Krishnan has joined as new regular VC of CUTN on 6th August, 2021.

Ranking

CUTN was ranked in the 101–150 band among universities in India by the National Institutional Ranking Framework (NIRF) in 2020.

Notable alumni
 Vinayak Sasikumar, Lyricist

References

External links
 
 

Central universities in India
Central University of Tamil Nadu
Tiruvarur district
Educational institutions established in 2009
2009 establishments in Tamil Nadu